Kernel Holding S.A. is the largest producer of sunflower oil in Ukraine. It operates under the brands "Shchedry Dar", "Stozhar" and "Chumak Zolota", exports oils and grain worldwide, and provides storage for grains and seeds. It produces 8% of sunflower oil in the world and its products are supplied to sixty countries. It operates 28 grain elevators in Ukraine with a total storage capacity of 2.34 million tons of grain, the highest among private-sector companies in the country.

History
It was established in 1994 by Andriy Verevskyi.

Kernel launched an initial public offering on the Warsaw Stock Exchange in 2007, becoming the second Ukrainian company to hold an IPO in Warsaw. In 2020, Forbes Ukraine ranked Kernel as the third-largest private-sector company in Ukraine by revenue. Forbes Ukraine ranked Kernel the fourth-best employer in its 2021 list of the fifty best employers in the country.

The company is actively investing in the development of small and medium agribusiness in Ukraine. Since 2019, the Open Agribusiness affiliate program has been operating. Kernel provides small and medium-sized partners with technology and agronomic support, access to credit, currency and forward programs. The company also helps partners to protect property from raiders, provides funding for the construction of elevators, granaries, land purchase. The project allows farmers to increase land productivity, increase yields and profits.

References 

Companies based in Kyiv
Ukrainian companies established in 1994
Companies listed on the Warsaw Stock Exchange
Agriculture companies of Ukraine